Kastri is a village in the island of Cythera, Islands regional unit, Greece.  Kastri has been occupied by humans since the Bronze Age, and was an important settlement of the Early Helladic/Minoan Period of Crete. Kastri is thought to have been an early settlement of Minoan Crete.  Kastri on Cythera is considerably but directly north of the ancient site of Kydonia, which was the major northwestern Cretan ancient city.

See also
 Kydonia

Line notes

References
 Cyprian Broodbank and Evangelia Kiriatzi, The First "Minoans" of Kythera Revisited: Technology, Demography, and Landscape in the Prepalatial Aegean, American Journal of Archaeology, volume: 111, issue 2, pages 241–274, April 2007 
 C. Michael Hogan, Cydonia, The Modern Antiquarian, Jan. 23, 2008
 Ohio State University, A Brief History of Northern Kythera, 

Kythira